"Gone Abie Gone" is the fourth episode of the twenty-fourth season of the American animated television series The Simpsons and the 512th episode overall. It first aired on the Fox network in the United States on November 11, 2012, and in the United Kingdom on Sky 1 on April 7, 2013. The episode received mixed reviews.

Plot

Homer receives a large sum of money when Squeaky Voiced Teen accidentally throws hot onion rings on him in the Gulp N’ Blow drive-thru. Homer uses the money as a college fund for Lisa and plans to put it in a bank, but Lenny and Carl warn him that banks are not as safe as they used to be.

Following this warning, he instead puts the fund on an online poker site, which horrifies Lisa. Eventually, however, Lisa finds enjoyment in gambling her college fund to other citizens in Springfield, increasing the amount of money with every win. The gambling soon takes its toll on Lisa. During one game, she relentlessly decides to bet all of her money, but is mortified when one of the other players, revealed to be Sideshow Bob, wins the game instead, therefore winning her entire college fund. Saddened, Lisa quits gambling. Bart then approaches her, admits that he was using Sideshow Bob's image whenever he gambles online.  Unfortunately, the poker site somehow found out Bart and Lisa were underage and they are now back with the original $5,000. When asked why he did it, Bart admits that he actually loves Lisa and felt sorry for her, then demands her to not tell anyone about this exchange.

Meanwhile, Homer and Marge arrive at Springfield Retirement Castle to visit Grampa. There, the staff inform them that Grampa had been missing for a while. Searching his room for clues, they find a photo of Spiro's, a restaurant where Grampa was revealed to work at. Homer is puzzled by this as he does not remember Grampa having a job there. The two go to Spiro's and talk to the manager, who points them to the direction of Rita LaFleur, a singer who worked alongside Grampa. Homer and Marge go to Rita, who tells them that she was married to Grampa and that Homer even knew this during his childhood. The relationship ended, however, when Homer was badly injured in a car accident and Grampa stayed behind to take care of him instead of accompanying Rita to Europe for a music tour the two had been planning together. Shocked by the revelation, Homer feels a new respect for his father because of the sacrifices he made for the sake of him. He and Marge then go to a winery where Grampa frequented and find him working there. Grampa refuses to go back to the retirement home, but changes his mind when Homer promises that the family will visit him more frequently. Unexpectedly, Rita pays Grampa a visit by playing his old song on the piano and he joins her.

Reception

Ratings
The Simpsons earned a 3.2 in the 18-49 demographic up from 2.6 the previous week. It was watched by a total of 6.86 million viewers. This made it the most watched show of the night on Fox and the most watched in the 18-49 demographic. The episode was repeated on the 23rd and 30 December and was watched by a total of 5.54 million and 6.69 million viewers respectively and winning the Animation Domination line up on both nights.

Critical reception
Robert David Sullivan of The A.V. Club gave the episode a C+, commenting that the Homer-Grampa subplot was "another thin story with little satiric spark, and we don’t even get much of Grampa Simpson in cranky-old-man insanity" and the Lisa subplot as "especially inconsequential".

References

External links 
 
 "Gone Abie Gone"  at theSimpsons.com

The Simpsons (season 24) episodes
2012 American television episodes